The 1983 Soviet Cup was an association football cup competition of the Soviet Union. The winner of the competition, Shakhter Donetsk qualified for the continental tournament.

Competition schedule

First preliminary round
All games took place on February 19, 1983.

Second preliminary round
The base game day was February 24, 1983

Round of 16
The base game day was March 3, 1983

Quarterfinals
The base game day was March 11, 1983

Semifinals
The base game day was March 19, 1983

Final

External links
 Complete calendar. helmsoccer.narod.ru
 1983 Soviet Cup. Footballfacts.ru
 1983 Soviet football season. RSSSF
 Возвращение к истокам (Летопись Акселя Вартаняна.1983 год. Часть четвертая.). www.sport-express.ru

Soviet Cup seasons
Cup
Soviet Cup
Soviet Cup